Songy is a commune in the Marne department in north-eastern France.

The "wild girl of Songi"
In September, 1731 Marie Angélique, called the "wild girl of Songi" or the "wild girl of Champagne", was captured at Songy. Then, she spent some months in the castle of the Viscount d'Epinoy.

The castle of the Viscount d'Epinoy can still be seen today, and is close to the 12th-century church that remains in the village.

See also
Communes of the Marne department

References

Communes of Marne (department)